The following is a list of Georgetown Hoyas men's basketball head coaches. The Hoyas have had 17 coaches in their 113-year, 111-season history. Patrick Ewing is the current head coach.

Notes

References

hoyabasketball.com The Georgetown Basketball History Project: Head Coaches
hoyabasketball.com The Georgetown Basketball History Project: Year By Year Records

Georgetown

Georgetown Hoyas basketball, men's, coaches